Johnny Abdo (Arabic: جوني عبده, born 1940) is a Lebanese former head of military intelligence and ambassador, currently willingly residing in Paris. He is best known for his knowledge of the deep secrets of the Lebanese Civil War.

Biography 
He was the chief of Lebanese intelligence in the late 1970s and early 1980s, which was known as the Second Bureau (المكتب الثاني) during president Elias Sarkis's rule. 

In the 1970s, his name rose to prominence due to the important role he played during the Lebanese Civil War, during which he helped arranging the election of president Bashir Gemayel, the leader of the Lebanese Forces, with who he had a dispute in the past.

After Bashir was assassinated, his brother Amin Gemayel assumed the presidency and he appointed him ambassador to Lebanon in the country Switzerland in 1983, then France in the early 90s until 1995.

He is currently living in Paris.

References 

People of the Lebanese Civil War
Candidates for President of Lebanon
Lebanese Maronites
Lebanese military personnel
Living people
1940 births